Yaya Kerim (born 10 August 1991) is a Chadian football striker and the member of Chad national football team. He currently plays for Renaissance in the Chad Premier League.

Career 

Yaya Kerim started his football career in Gazelle. In 2010, he joined Renaissance FC. He helped his team win the Chad Cup and Super Cup, scoring the goal in both finals. In 2011, he was called on a trial by Spanish segunda division club Real Valladolid. He joined USM El Harrach in 2012. He currently plays for Renaissance in the Chad Premier League.

International career 

He has 7 caps for national team, and he was a part of qualifying campaign for 2012 African Cup of Nations. He debuted in home match against Togo which ended 2–2, in July 2010. For the national team, he usually plays left wing, or left back.

See also 

 List of Chad international footballers

References

External links

1991 births
Living people
Chadian footballers
People from N'Djamena
USM El Harrach players
Expatriate footballers in Algeria
Chadian expatriate footballers
Chad international footballers
Chadian expatriate sportspeople in Algeria
Association football utility players